The Lenham Cross is a chalk cross carved into the hillside to the north of Lenham in Kent, in England.  

It was designed by Mr C H Groom, the headmaster of the village school, as a First World War memorial.

The cross was filled in during the Second World War to prevent it being used as a navigation aid by the German Luftwaffe.  It became a Grade II listed building in 2017.

A dedicatory stone of rough-hewn granite was sited in an enclosure with steps and railings at the south end of the cross, beside the Pilgrim's Way, with a smooth face inscribed by the names of 42 men of the parish who were killed during the First World War. A smaller stone listing 14 more names was added after the Second Would War. A bench and plaque were added to the original memorial enclosure in 1977, donated by the Ashford branch of the Royal Electrical and Mechanical Engineers Association.

See also
 Shoreham Memorial Cross

References 
 'The Cross': a hill-figure war memorial at Lenham, National Heritage List for England, Historic England 
 Lenham Cross, War Memorials Register, Imperial War Museums
 Lenham - WW1 and WW2, War Memorials Register, Imperial War Museums
 Lenham Cross, War Memorials Online

Hill figures in England
Listed buildings in Kent
History of Kent
Monuments and memorials in Kent 
World War I memorials in England
1922 works